Estación Central ((), Spanish  for "central station") is a commune of Chile located in Santiago Province, Santiago Metropolitan Region. Its namesake is the Estación Central railway station located in the commune.

Demographics
The population fell by 7.5% (10,502 people) between the 1992 and 2002 censuses. The 2006 population was projected to be 121,282 people.

Stats
Average annual household income: $21,601 (PPP, 2006)
Population below poverty line: 7.3% (2006)
Regional quality of life index: 76.38, mid-high, 22 out of 52 (2005)
Human Development Index: 0.735, 60 out of 341 (2003)

Administration
As a commune, Estación Central is a third-level administrative division of Chile administered by a municipal council, headed by an alcalde who is directly elected every four years. The mayor is Miguel Abdo Ara (UDI). The communal council has the following members:
 Ivo Pavlovic Lazcano (UDI)
 Angélica Cid Venegas (PS)
 Felipe Zavala Jara (PC)
 Patricio González Ayala (DC)
 Beatriz Lagos Campos (UDI)
 Felipe Muñoz Vallejos (PS)
 Guillermo Flores Contreras (PPD)

Within the electoral divisions of Chile, Estación Central is represented in the Chamber of Deputies by Pepe Auth (PPD) and Mónica Zalaquett (UDI) as part of the 20th electoral district, which consists entirely of the Santiago commune. The commune is represented in the Senate by Guido Girardi Lavín (PPD) and Jovino Novoa Vásquez (UDI) as part of the 7th senatorial constituency (Santiago-West).

References

External links
Municipality homepage
Virtual Tour in 360° of Estación Central | Flip360

Populated places in Santiago Province, Chile
Geography of Santiago, Chile
Communes of Chile